The Joseph Steffens House is a historic house located in eastern Carroll County, Illinois, east of Milledgeville. Settler Joseph Steffens built the rammed earth house in 1843; it is the only surviving rammed earth house in the state. Rammed earth construction uses soil to build walls by pressurizing it in molds; the method was common in continental Europe and saw some use in 18th-century eastern America and in the Great Plains and Southwest during the Great Depression, though it was rare in Illinois. While Steffens claimed that he borrowed the construction method from his former house in Canada, he was also likely influenced by American authors who promoted the method and a local timber shortage.

The house was added to the National Register of Historic Places on April 10, 1985.

This house no longer stands; there is no existing structure. It collapsed in the late 2000s. This site is now a cornfield.

References

Houses on the National Register of Historic Places in Illinois
Houses completed in 1843
Rammed earth buildings and structures
Houses in Carroll County, Illinois
National Register of Historic Places in Carroll County, Illinois